Onesphore Nzikwinkunda (born 10 June 1997) is a Burundian long-distance runner, who specializes in the 5K and 10K. In 2019, he competed in the men's 10,000 metres at the 2019 World Athletics Championships held in Doha, Qatar. He finished in 18th place.

In 2017, he competed in the senior men's race at the 2017 IAAF World Cross Country Championships held in Kampala, Uganda. He finished in 14th place. In 2019, he competed in the senior men's race at the 2019 IAAF World Cross Country Championships held in Aarhus, Denmark. He again finished in 14th place.

In 2019, he also represented Burundi at the 2019 African Games and he finished in 6th place in the men's 10,000 metres event.

References

External links
 

1997 births
Living people
Burundian male long-distance runners
World Athletics Championships athletes for Burundi
Athletes (track and field) at the 2019 African Games
African Games competitors for Burundi
20th-century Burundian people
21st-century Burundian people